SCFA may refer to:

Andrés Sabella Gálvez International Airport, Chile
Short-chain fatty acid, a fatty acid with an aliphatic tail of less than 6 carbon atoms
 Singapore Chinese Football Association, a sub-association of Singapore FA
 Somalia-China Friendship Association